Irina Rodina (Russian: Ири́на Ви́кторовна Родина) (born July 23, 1973) is a Russian judoka and Sambist. She is 11-time world champion of Sambo making her the most titled female practitioner in Sambo.  She competed in Judo at the 2000 Sydney Olympics in the heavyweight division, finishing in equal seventh place. Rodina also competed in mixed martial arts.

Achievements

Mixed martial arts record

|-
| Loss
| align=center | 3-1
| Erin Toughill
| Decision (split)
| ReMix – World Cup 2000
| 
| align=center | 2
| align=center | 5:00
| Japan
|
|-
| Win
| align=center | 3-0
| Yumiko Hotta
| Submission (armbar)
| UTT – Women's Vale Tudo Championship Finals
| 
| align=center | 1
| align=center | 3:11
| Japan
|
|-
| Win
| align=center | 2-0
| Reggie Bennett
| Submission (armbar)
| UTT – Women's Vale Tudo Championship Finals
| 
| align=center | 1
| align=center | 9:47
| Japan
|
|-
| Win
| align=center | 1-0
| Yoko Takahashi
| Submission (armbar)
| UTT – Women's Vale Tudo Championship Finals
| 
| align=center | 1
| align=center | 6:06
| Japan
|

References

External links
 
 Irina Rodina Awakening Profile

Russian female judoka
Judoka at the 2000 Summer Olympics
Olympic judoka of Russia
Russian female mixed martial artists
Russian sambo practitioners
Living people
1973 births
Mixed martial artists utilizing sambo
Mixed martial artists utilizing judo
Sportspeople from Tula, Russia